Yeda Rorato Crusius (born July 26, 1944) is an economist and was governor of the Brazilian state of Rio Grande do Sul from January 1, 2007, until December 31, 2010. She was the first female governor of the state. She wrote her autobiography.

Background and political associations

She graduated in Economics from the University of São Paulo and Vanderbilt University. She has been living in Porto Alegre since 1970, when she married Carlos Augusto Crusius. In 1990, she joined PSDB.

Court cases 
Crusius was accused of environmental crimes during her tenure as Rio Grande do Sul governor but was acquitted by Gilmar Mendes. She was also prosecuted for alleged corruption and money laundering activities in 2006 and 2010 involving the Odebrecht Group. This Brazilian conglomerate was accused of making payments for Crusius' congressional campaign. The In 2019, the 3rd Federal Court of Santa Maria, Rio Grande do Sul, convicted her for administrative misconduct over a fraud scheme that involved Rio Grande do Sul State Traffic Department (Detran-RS), the Technology and Science Support Foundation (Fatec), and the Educational and Cultural Foundation for Development.

References

1944 births
Living people
Government ministers of Brazil
Brazilian economists
Brazilian women economists
Brazilian people of Italian descent
University of São Paulo alumni
Vanderbilt University alumni
Governors of Rio Grande do Sul
Brazilian Social Democracy Party politicians
Women government ministers of Brazil
Women state governors of Brazil
Brazilian people of German descent